The 2020–21 Biathlon World Cup – Stage 6 was the sixth event of the season and was held in Oberhof, Germany, from 13 to 17 January 2021.

Schedule of events 
The events took place at the following times.

Medal winners

Men

Women

References 

Biathlon World Cup - Stage 6, 2020-21
2020–21 Biathlon World Cup
Biathlon competitions in Germany
Biathlon World Cup